Deel may refer to:
 Deel (clothing), the main article of traditional Mongolian clothing
 Deel (company), a privately held San Francisco-based payroll and compliance company
 River Deel, in County Limerick, Ireland
 Deel, Virginia, unincorporated community in Buchanan County, Virginia, United States

See also
 Dele (disambiguation)